Modern Vidya Niketan (MVN) Schools are located in the Faridabad, National Capital Region (NCR) of India. Modern Vidya Niketan has been categorised under English medium school. The schools are affiliated to Central Board of Secondary Education (CBSE), Delhi.

History
The first school was established in the year 1983 under the Societies Registration Act XXI of 1960 by Shri Gopal Sharma and Mrs. Kanta Sharma.

In 2009, the Sector 17 school produced the IIT-JEE topper.
This feat was repeated by another MVN student, in 2012. In 2008–09, 140 students from the school got admitted to IITs, the highest number from any single institution in India.
Srishti Rana, winner of Miss Asia Pacific World, is an alumnus.

Branches
 Modern Vidya Niketan, Sector 17, Faridabad
 Modern Vidya Niketan, Aravali Hills, Faridabad
 Modern Vidya Niketan, Palwal
 Modern Vidya Niketan, Sector 88, Faridabad

See also
Education in India
Literacy in India
List of institutions of higher education in Haryana
Modern Vidya Niketan School, Aravali Hills

References

CBSE Delhi
1983 establishments in Haryana
Schools in Haryana